Ronald William Paul Allison (26 January 1932 – 26 July 2022) was a British journalist. He was the press secretary of Queen Elizabeth II from 1968 to 1978.

Books
Look Back in Wonder  (1968) Hodder and Stoughton
Charles, Prince of Our Time (1978)
 Britain in the Seventies (1980)  Country Life Books
The Royal Encyclopaedia, co-authored with Sarah Riddell (1991)
The Queen: 50 Years – a Celebration (2001)

References 

1932 births
2022 deaths
British journalists